Ilija Bozoljac and Horia Tecău were the defending champions, but decided not to participate.
Peter Luczak and Alessandro Motti defeated James Cerretani and Adil Shamasdin 7–6(5), 7–6(3) in the final.

Seeds

Draw

Draw

External links
 Main draw

2011,Doubles
Marrakech,Doubles